József Bagáry (January 8, 1840 – May 14, 1919) was Slovene Roman Catholic priest and writer in Hungary.

Born in Muraszombat, Vas County, Kingdom of Hungary (present-day Murska Sobota, Slovenia). His father was József Bagáry, Hungarian petty nobleman, his mother was Slovene, Katalin Monek.
He studied in Kőszeg and Szombathely, was consecrated on July 14, 1866. Chaplain in Szentgyörgy, Cserencsócz, Tissina and Muraszombat (now Sveti Jurij, Rogašovci, Črenšovci, Tišina and Murska Sobota, Slovenia).

By 1874 priest in Martyáncz (now Martjanci, Slovenia), in 1912 was retire on a pension, and died in Murska Sobota.

Works 
 First Reader (Perve Knige – čtenyá za Katholičanske vesničke šolé na Povelênye drüžbe svétoga Števana správlene: po Bárány Ignáci pripravnice vučitel – ravnitel Elsö olvasó – könyv)

References 
 Vasi digitális könyvtár – Vasi egyházmegye
 Anton Trstenjak: Slovenci na Ogrskem, Narodnapisna in književna črtica, OBJAVA ARHIVSKIH VIROV MARIBOR 2006.

See also 
 List of Slovene writers and poets in Hungary

1840 births
1919 deaths
People from Murska Sobota
20th-century Slovenian Roman Catholic priests
Slovene Austro-Hungarians
Slovenian writers and poets in Hungary
19th-century Slovenian Roman Catholic priests
19th-century Hungarian Roman Catholic priests